Sibirocosa kolymensis is a species of wolf spider found in the Kolyma region in the far east of Russia.

This species has a body length of up to 7 mm. It is rather variable in colour, from brown to almost black. There are few external distinguishing marks (apart from a reddish heart-shaped mark on the abdomen of the male) and it can only be distinguished with certainty from related species by details of the genitalia.

References

Lycosidae
Spiders described in 2003
Spiders of Russia